George Willis "Kiddo" Davis (February 12, 1902 – March 4, 1983) was a Major League Baseball outfielder. He played all or part of eight seasons in the majors,  and -. He played for the St. Louis Cardinals, Cincinnati Reds, New York Giants, New York Yankees, and Philadelphia Phillies.

Biography 
Born in Bridgeport, Connecticut, Davis acquired the nickname “Kiddo” because he typically played baseball with children who were a few years older than he was. Davis attended Bridgeport High School before beginning his professional baseball career. He attended New York University where he also played baseball, batting .486 as an outfielder. 

In an eight-year major league career, Davis batted .282 (515-1824) with 281 runs scored, 19 home runs and 171 RBI. His on-base percentage was .336 and slugging percentage was .393. He compiled a .980 fielding percentage at all three outfield positions. In nine World Series games (1933 and 1936), he hit .381 (8-21).

Davis died in Bridgeport in 1983.

References

External links

1902 births
1983 deaths
Major League Baseball outfielders
Baseball players from Connecticut
St. Louis Cardinals players
Cincinnati Reds players
New York Giants (NL) players
New York Yankees players
NYU Violets baseball players
Philadelphia Phillies players
Newark Bears (IL) players
Reading Keystones players
Hartford Senators players
Nashville Vols players
St. Paul Saints (AA) players
Jersey City Giants players
Sportspeople from Bridgeport, Connecticut